The Western Athletic Conference men's basketball tournament is the conference championship tournament in men's basketball for the Western Athletic Conference (WAC). Even though the WAC was founded in 1962, the annual tournament has only been held since 1984.

The winner of the tournament is guaranteed a spot in the NCAA basketball tournament every year.

Format and host
The event has alternated between being hosted at campus sites and neutral sites throughout its history. From the inaugural event in 1984 until 1992 the regular season champion hosted the tournament, but in 1993 and 1994 the event was held at the Delta Center (now Vivint Arena) in Salt Lake City which, although located less than five miles from then-conference member Utah's campus, was considered a neutral site. From 1995 through 2009 the event returned to on-campus sites, although the location was awarded through a predetermined bidding process rather than being given to the regular-season champion. Since 2010 the tournament has again been held at a neutral site, namely Orleans Arena in Paradise, Nevada.

Starting with the 2023 tournament, the WAC adopted a new seeding system based on advanced team metrics, developed in large part by statistical guru Ken Pomeroy. Tournament entry will still be based on conference record.

Tournament results

Performance by school

 Schools highlighted in yellow are members of the WAC as of the current 2022–23 season.
 Among current WAC members, five have competed in at least one WAC tournament but failed to reach the title game: California Baptist, Sam Houston, Stephen F. Austin, Utah Valley, and UTRGV. The 2022–23 season is the first in which California Baptist is eligible for NCAA-sponsored postseason play.
 Two other members, Tarleton and Utah Tech (renamed from Dixie State before the 2022–23 season), have yet to play in a WAC tournament. Both started transitions from NCAA Division II to Division I in 2020, and are ineligible for NCAA-sponsored postseason play until 2024–25. Current WAC rules allow transitional schools to play in the WAC tournament upon their arrival in the conference, but before 2022–23 such schools were ineligible until their third transitional seasons. Both can play in the 2023 WAC tournament should they qualify.
 Southern Utah is playing its first WAC season in 2022–23.
 New Mexico State and Sam Houston will leave the WAC for Conference USA after the 2022–23 season.

Broadcasters

Television

Radio

See also
 WAC women's basketball tournament

References

 
Recurring sporting events established in 1984